Mykolaivka is an urban-type settlement in Donetsk Raion of Donetsk Oblast in Ukraine. It belongs to Donetsk urban hromada, one of the hromadas of Ukraine. Population:

Demographics
Native language as of the Ukrainian Census of 2001:
 Ukrainian 42.97%
 Russian 55.42%
 Belarusian, German and Greek 0.4%

References

Urban-type settlements in Donetsk Raion